"Smokin' in the Boys Room" is a song originally recorded by Brownsville Station in 1973 on their album Yeah!. It reached number 3 in Canada and on the US Billboard Hot 100, and was later certified by the RIAA.

The song is about students hoping to avoid being caught violating their school's smoking ban by smoking cigarettes in the boys' restroom. The song begins with a spoken recitation, and the verses and a part of the chorus, are mostly spoken, rather than sung.

Chart performance

Weekly Charts

Year-end charts

Mötley Crüe version

The song was covered in 1985 by Mötley Crüe. Released as a single, "Smokin' in the Boys Room" reached #16 on the U.S. Billboard Hot 100, and became Mötley Crüe's first Top 40 hit.
Their version of the song appears in the 1986 film The Wraith directed by Chieffallo. A LeAnn Rimes version of the song appeared on the album Nashville Outlaws:  A Tribute To Mötley Crüe.

Music video
Crüe's version was accompanied by a conceptual music video featuring Michael Berryman as the school principal.  The video focuses on a high school student named Jimmy who is mistreated and misunderstood in school. After he is paddled by the principal for (truthfully) claiming that a dog ran off with his homework, a frustrated Jimmy goes to the boys' bathroom where he sees Motley Crüe in the mirrors. The band pulls him through the mirror to join them, and Jimmy and Motley Crüe watch a dystopian vision of the school through a barred window. At the end of the music video, the principal apologizes to Jimmy and offers an A for his missing homework; instead, Jimmy doesn't accept and rips up the homework. After Jimmy walks away, Nikki Sixx reaches out of the mirror and snatches the dumbfounded principal's toupée.

Charts

Personnel
Vince Neil - Vocals
Mick Mars - Guitar
Nikki Sixx - Bass
Tommy Lee - Drums
Mickey Raphael - Harmonica

Other versions
In 1981, the song was translated to Hebrew and covered by T-Slam under the name "Me'ashnim Beyahad" (Smoking Together) on their debut album. The English-language version of the album, "Loud Radio" featured the original version of the song.

The song is referenced in the television program King of the Hill in season 10 episode 10. Brownsville Station is the favorite band of the character Lucky. The song "inspired him to smoke" and plays over the ending credits.

References

External links
 

1973 singles
1985 singles
Big Tree Records singles
Brownsville Station (band) songs
Elektra Records singles
Mötley Crüe songs
Song recordings produced by Tom Werman
Songs about school
Songs about tobacco
Music videos directed by Wayne Isham
1973 songs
Blues rock songs